Chemawa Indian School  is a Native American boarding school in Salem, Oregon, United States. Named after the Chemawa band of the Kalapuya people of the Willamette Valley, it opened on February 25, 1880 as an elementary school. Grades were added and dropped, and it became a fully accredited high school in 1927, when lower grades were dropped. In 2005, it continued to serve ninth through twelfth grades. It is sometimes referred to as Chemawa High School. It has primarily served students of tribes from the Pacific Northwest and Alaska.

The second Indian boarding school to be established, Chemawa Indian School is the oldest continuously operating Native American boarding school in the United States. Its graduates number in the thousands. Former names for the school include Forest Grove Indian and Industrial Training School, United States Indian Training and Normal School,  Salem Indian Industrial and Training School and Harrison Institute. At its peak of enrollment in 1926, it had 1,000 students. New buildings were constructed in the 1970s on a campus near the original one, where at one time 70 buildings stood, including barns and other buildings related to the agricultural programs.

History 

The history of the Chemawa Indian School dates to the 1870s when the U.S. Government pursued a policy of assimilation of Native Americans. Based on the theories of Captain (later Brigadier General) Richard Henry Pratt and perceived success at the Carlisle Indian School near Harrisburg, Pennsylvania, the government authorized a boarding school for Native American children in the Pacific Northwest region of the United States. It was the second such school. Pratt's philosophy was to use immersive education to assimilate and integrate the Native American population into mainstream society. This was in contrast with the government's earlier philosophy, which assumed that Indians were inherently different from whites, and that no education could "civilize" them. The schools founded under Pratt's influence were deliberately located far from Indian reservations, in order to separate the students from traditional ways of life.

A site was chosen at Forest Grove, Oregon on four acres (16,000 m2) of land rented from Pacific University. Lieutenant Melville Wilkinson, a member of the United States Army and Secretary to General Oliver Otis Howard, was in charge of the project, as Indian affairs were administered by the War Department. $5,000 was provided to start the school.

Lt. Wilkinson, with the help of eight Puyallup Indian youths, began construction on the buildings in 1880. The first  class of students consisted of fourteen boys and four girls. All the students came from the State of Washington, seventeen from the Puyallup Indian reservation on Puget Sound and one boy from the Nisqually Indian reservation. Students' curriculum was determined by gender. The boys were taught painting, baking, drafting, machining, masonry, blacksmithing, shoemaking, carpentry, and wagon making, artisan skills considered important to the rural environment of most reservations. Girls studied a collection of skills classified as the "domestic arts".

Prior to 1883, the United States Congress planned to appropriate a larger amount of funds for the Chemawa Indian School. Several factors led to the search for a new site for the school, including local resistance to the school, a need for more land in order to rear livestock and cultivate crops to teach farming skills, and the destruction by fire of the girls' dormitory in 1884.

At this point, officials looked at the temporary leased nature of the land, as well as the poor drainage, and began considering alternative sites around the Willamette Valley. Three sites were donated for the new school. Newberg, Oregon offered 100 acres (400,000 m2) of heavily timbered land, 23 acres (93,000 m2) near Forest Grove, Oregon with a pasture parcel of 75 acres (304,000 m2) approximately four miles (6 km) away from the main site, and 171 acres (692,000 m2) partially cleared, sparsely timbered land in Salem, Oregon, served by a spur of the main railroad through the Willamette Valley. School officials chose the Salem site since it was close to Oregon's capital and had the most land.

In 1885, the school moved to the site five miles (8 km) north of Salem and began construction. The first buildings were made of wood, and were later razed to make way for more permanent brick structures. On June 1, 1885, the Chemawa Indian School was opened with approximately half of the students moving to the new location and half staying behind in Forest Grove. On October 1, 1885, John Lee became superintendent of Chemawa Indian School (then known as Salem Indian Training School). After a winter of separation, and after staff and students finished construction on three new buildings on the campus, he withdrew the remaining students from Forest Grove and reunited them all on the Salem, Oregon campus.

The first graduating class completed the sixth grade in 1886. Subsequently, courses were added through the tenth grade. In 1900, the school had 453 students; it was the largest of its kind in Oregon with a federal budget of $57,182.62. The emphasis at that time was on vocational education, considered appropriate to students' needs after returning to their reservations.

The 1913 report lists farming as one of the major areas of training. Dairy farming, animal husbandry, and other farm methods provided food which was preserved by the students for later use. A school library provided reading material. Students could participate in sports of basketball, baseball, and football. There were 690 students enrolled, including 175 Alaskan Inuit children.

In 1915, the school's Indian String Quartet gave a benefit concert at the Rose City Park Methodist Church in Portland, Oregon.

By 1922, the  campus had 70 buildings. Most of the buildings were wood frame, but some of the newer ones were of brick construction. Some of the land had been purchased by Native American students and given to the school as a token of their gratitude, with the money earned by picking hops.

Peak enrollment at Chemawa took place in 1926, with almost 1,000 students. 11th and 12th grades were added to the curriculum and all grades below 6th were dropped. In 1927, Chemawa became a fully accredited high school.

The school was threatened with closure in the early 1930s, as the government sought economies during the Great Depression. Interested journalists and Oregon's delegation to the U.S. Congress lobbied with the US Bureau of Indian Affairs to keep it open, and it continued with 300 students.

Lawney Reyes, who attended the school in 1940–1942 (as did his sister, Luana Reyes), devotes two chapters of his memoir White Grizzly Bear's Legacy: Learning to be Indian to his experiences there.  He wrote that his consciousness of being "Indian" was largely formed through his conversations with other students.

He also wrote:
I did not experience any harsh restraint against Indian culture or tradition at Chemewa. Generations of Indians before me had already felt the full force of that practice. I learned that in earlier years, speaking the Indian language had been forbidden. White authority had dealt harshly with Indian dancing, singing, and drumming. Students were not allowed to braid their hair or wear any ornaments with Indian design motifs. During my time, efforts to teach the white way were still in force, but attempts to abolish or restrain Indian culture were past. The practice of Indian culture, however, was not encouraged or discussed.

The 1940s and 1950s brought other changes, including a special program for Navajo Nation students and changes in policy to attract Pacific Northwest students, and particularly those from Alaska.

In the late 1970s, Chemawa moved to a new campus on adjacent land, with most of the original brick buildings destroyed after the shift. By 2017 the new campus was fenced.

National Register of Historic Places
In 1992 the school's Colonial Revival-style hospital and four other early structures were listed on the National Register of Historic Places (NRHP) as the Chemawa Indian School Site. These buildings were surviving brick structures on the school's "old campus"; most of the older buildings had been demolished after the school moved to the adjacent "new campus" in the late 1970s. As of 2009, it is unknown whether any of the historic buildings still exist. The Chemawa Cemetery may be the only part of the old campus still intact.

Student body
Circa 1988, 50% of the students in one year are not enrolled in the next and its students frequently move between various educational systems.

Cemetery and unmarked graves
In 2016, numerous unmarked graves of students were reported to have been found at the Chemawa Indian School Cemetery. Marsha Small, a North Cheyenne graduate student at Montana State University, used ground-penetrating radar to scan the site, finding hundreds, if not thousands of unmarked graves by comparing data to the 200 documented grave sites. Children at such boarding schools often suffered from epidemics in the dormitories of infectious diseases such as tuberculosis (incurable in the early 20th century), influenza and trachoma. Small published her findings in her thesis, A Voice for the Children of Chemawa Cemetery (2015). She is concerned with raising awareness in general about the graves, but also in order to protect the cemetery from potential damage due to a freeway interchange planned nearby.

Image gallery

Academics
Chemawa Indian School has been accredited through Northwest Association of Accredited Schools since 1971.

Partnership with Willamette University
In 2005, Chemawa Indian School formed a partnership with Willamette University, a private liberal arts college in Salem.  Willamette undergraduates, along with Chemawa peer tutors, provide tutoring to students four nights per week on the Chemawa campus.

2003 student death

Operations at the Chemawa Indian School were investigated following the death of a 16-year-old student in December 2003 who was from Warm Springs, Oregon. She died of alcohol poisoning after being locked in a detention cell after being found intoxicated on school grounds. The Inspector General of the U.S. Department of the Interior, together with the U.S. Attorney's office in Portland, Oregon investigated the incident. They found officials at fault.

This and other incidents at reservation detention facilities nationwide were the subject of hearings in June 2004 before the Indian Affairs Committee of the U.S. Senate. The Inspector General of the Department of the Interior noted poor conditions in BIA facilities, the lack of suitable BIA detention facilities for juveniles, high rates of suicide in existing facilities, and failure to report deaths as required, among other problems. He noted that facilities run by the tribes were often in better condition despite similar funding problems and understaffing.

Notable alumni
 Spade Cooley - bandleader, "King of Western Swing"
Frank LaPena - Nomtipom-Wintu American Indian painter, printmaker, ethnographer, professor, ceremonial dancer, poet, and writer.
 Bob Greene - Makah elder and second-to-last surviving Makah veteran of World War II

See also 
 Off-reservation boarding schools operated by the BIE
 Flandreau Indian School
 Riverside Indian School
 Sherman Indian High School
 Off-reservation boarding schools operated by tribes
 Circle of Nations Wahpeton Indian School
 Pierre Indian Learning Center
 Sequoyah Schools
 American Indian outing programs

References 
Specific

General
 Reyes, Lawney L. White Grizzly Bear's Legacy: Learning to be Indian, University of Washington Press, 2002. .

External links

 Historic images of Chemawa Indian School and Chemawa, Oregon railroad station, Salem Public Library
 Historic portrait of boys in military uniform at Chemawa Indian School, date unknown, University of Oregon digital collections
 Oregon State Library digital photo collections has approximately 50 historic photos of Chemawa (search on "Chemawa")
 "Investigative Report on the Chemawa Indian School Detention Facility", Department of the Interior, Office of Inspector General, 2004
 "Investigative Report On the Chemawa Indian School Detention Facility", US Dept. of Interior, Office of the Inspector General, 2004, 28 pages, June 22, 2015
 Friends of Marion County: Minutes of General Meeting, 15th March, 2006, with presentation by Chemawa historian SuAnn Reddick
 Carolyn J. Marr, "Assimilation Through Education: Indian Boarding Schools in the Pacific Northwest", 1997–1998, digital project, University of Washington Libraries
 Pringle Creek Watershed Assessment includes extensive history of Chemawa band and Chemawa Indian School
 

High schools in Salem, Oregon
Native American history of Oregon
Boarding schools in Oregon
Public boarding schools in the United States
Educational institutions established in 1880
Schools accredited by the Northwest Accreditation Commission
National Register of Historic Places in Salem, Oregon
Native American boarding schools
Public high schools in Oregon
1880 establishments in Oregon